John Albert Webb (21 December 1936 – 9 November 2022) was a British racewalker. He competed in the men's 20 kilometres walk at the 1968 Summer Olympics.

References

1936 births
2022 deaths
Athletes (track and field) at the 1968 Summer Olympics
British male racewalkers
Olympic athletes of Great Britain
Place of birth missing (living people)